Isaac Jogues, S.J. (10 January 1607 – 18 October 1646) was a French missionary and martyr who traveled and worked among the Iroquois, Huron, and other Native populations in North America. He was the first European to name Lake George, calling it Lac du Saint Sacrement (Lake of the Blessed Sacrament). In 1646, Jogues was martyred by the Mohawk at their village of Ossernenon, near the Mohawk River.

Jogues, Jean de Brébeuf and six other martyred missionaries, all Jesuit priests or laypeople associated with them, were canonized by the Catholic Church in 1930; they are known as the Canadian Martyrs, or the North American Martyrs. A shrine was built in their honor at Auriesville, New York, formerly believed to be that of the Mohawk village. Their feast day is celebrated on 19 October in the General Roman Calendar and 26 September in Canada.

Early life and education
Isaac Jogues was born to Laurent Jogues and Françoise de Sainte-Mesmin on 10 January 1607. He was born in Orléans, France, into a bourgeois family, where he was the fifth of nine children. He was educated at home until the age of ten, at which point he began attending Jesuit schools. In 1624, at the age of seventeen, he entered the Jesuit novitiate at Rouen in Northern France. Here, his Master of Novices was Louis Lallemant. The Jesuit community had a strong missionary spirit, beginning in 1625 with their first mission to New France, including missionary pioneers, Énemond Massé, and later, Jean de Brébeuf. Lallement had two brothers and a nephew serving as missionaries in the colony of New France. These Jesuit missionaries inspired Jogues, and he aspired to follow in their footsteps.

Jogues professed simple vows in 1626, and went to study philosophy at the royal college of La Flèche. In 1629, he taught humanities to boys in Rouen. In 1633, Jogues was sent to the Collège de Clermont in Paris to pursue his studies in Theology. In 1636, he was ordained a priest at Clermont.

Early missions 
In 1636 missionary fathers Brébeuf, Charles Lallemant and Massé returned from New France. They told Jogues of the hardships, treacheries, and tortures which ordinarily awaited missionaries in New France. Their accounts however, increased Jogues' desire to "devote himself to labour there for the conversion and welfare of the natives". Soon after Jogues was ordained, he accepted service in the missions and embarked to New France with several other missionaries, among them Charles Garnier. Jogues was assigned as a missionary to the Huron and Algonquian peoples; both were allies of the French in Quebec.

Jogues sailed from France on 8 April 1636, and eight weeks later, his ship dropped anchor in the Baie des Chaleurs. Jogues arrived in Quebec only several weeks later, on 2 July. On arrival, Jogues wrote to his mother: "I do not know it is to enter Heaven, but this I know—that it would be difficult to experience in this world a joy more excessive and more overflowing than I felt in setting foot in the New World, and celebrating my first Mass on the day of Visitation." 

Jogues joined Jean de Brébeuf, the Superior of the Jesuit Mission, at their settlement on Lake Huron, the village of St-Joseph (Ihonatiria), on 11 September. Upon his arrival, Jogues was stricken by fever. Soon after that, a similar epidemic broke out among other Jesuits and the native people. Due to recurring epidemics, the Huron blamed the Black Coats, as they called the Jesuits, threatening to kill them all. Father Brébeuf conciliated them, and by the following year, relations had improved as evidenced by one of his reports: "We are gladly heard, and there is scarcely a village that has not invited us to go to it... And at last, it is understood from our whole conduct that we have not come to buy skins or to carry on any traffic, but solely to teach them and to procure them their souls' health."

For six years, Jogues lived in the village of St-Joseph and learned the Hurons' ways and language. The missionaries "accommodated themselves to the customs and food of the savages" as much as possible to show the Indians that they intended to share their life. Gradually, the native people began to accept Jogues. This did not last long, however, as there were some Indians who had been "among the English and Dutch settlers to the south" who spread reports that the missionaries brought "calamity wherever they went and that they had in consequence been driven out of Europe."

Jogues traveled with Garnier to the Petun, a first nations band located in modern-day southern Ontario, who were also known as the Tobacco Nation for their chief commodity crop. The natives of the village were so uninviting to the missionaries that the Fathers thought it would be impossible to do any missionary work among them. The rumors that had encircled them spread to the village and quickly discovered that their cause was just as hopeless as in the former place. They traveled from village to village, until after a couple of months, they decided that they could not continue to do their missionary work. Their luck changed, however, when in 1639, the new superior of the Jesuit Mission, Father Jérôme Lalemant, entrusted the building of Fort Sainte-Marie to Jogues.

In September 1641, Jogues and Charles Raymbaut went into the territory of the Sauteurs (Oijbwe). Some two thousand Indians welcomed them upon their arrival. Jogues settled down to the duties of a resident missioner at St. Mary's for some time.

Capture by the Iroquois  

On 3 August 1642, Jogues, Guillaume Couture, René Goupil, and a group of Christian Hurons were heading back from Quebec City when they were waylaid by a war party of the Mohawk Nation, part of the Iroquois Confederacy. Jogues allegedly hid in reeds and bushes but decided to leave his hiding place to join the prisoners so that he could comfort them and ensure that their faith in Christianity remained strong. Shortly after that, and in retaliation for comforting a tortured Guillaume Couture, the Mohawk beat Jogues with sticks, tore out his fingernails, then gnawed the ends of his fingers until finger bones were visible. The war party then took their captives on a journey to a Mohawk village. The villagers marched them through a gauntlet, consisting of rows of Iroquois armed with rods and sticks, beating the prisoners walking in single-file. Afterward, the Iroquois forced Jogues and the prisoners onto an elevated platform where they were mocked. A captive Algonquin woman then cut off Jogues' thumb. At night, the prisoners were tied spread-eagled in a cabin. Children threw burning coals onto their bodies. Three days later, Jogues and the prisoners were marched from one village to another, where the Iroquois flogged them in gauntlets and jabbed sticks into their wounds and sores. At the third village, Jogues was hung from a wooden plank and nearly lost consciousness until an Iroquois had pity on him and cut him free. Throughout his captivity, Jogues comforted, baptized, heard confession from, and absolved the other prisoners.

Hearing of their capture, Arent van Curler, commis of Rensselaerswyck, visited the "first castle" and attempted to ransom them, but without success as the Mohawk were not inclined to release them at that time. Van Curler was able to elicit a promise not to kill the captives. Instead of being put to death or integrated into a Mohawk family, Jogues remained a captive at large. Perpetually malnourished and inadequately dressed for the harsh winters, he spent his days gathering wood, praying, and proselytizing his captors. Seeking solace in his faith, Jogues prayed so intensely that he had visions: in one, he suddenly appeared in a bookstore covered in crosses and bought a book that reminded him that, to enter into Heaven, it was necessary to experience many tribulations. His captivity dragged on, lasting about a year, during which he experienced severe malnourishment and exposure to the cold. During this period, some noteworthy incidents were when he saved the life of a pregnant woman that had fallen into a deep, fast-flowing creek during the winter and when he baptized the Iroquois man who had freed him from the wooden torture device.

In the autumn of 1643, the Mohawk were persuaded to bring the priest with them when they came to Beverwijck to trade. Once there, Van Curler helped Jogues escape, hiding him in his barn until a deal could be reached. The Frenchman put on a ship to take him downriver. Reformed minister Johannes Megapolensis accompanied him to New Amsterdam, where Jogues stayed with the minister while waiting for a ship to take him to France. Jogues was the first Catholic priest to visit Manhattan Island. From there, he sailed back to France.

Return to France 
Pope Urban VIII considered Jogues a "living martyr" and gave him dispensation to say Mass with his mutilated hand. Under Catholic Church law of the time, the Blessed Sacrament could not be touched with any fingers but the thumb and forefinger. Jogues was unable to follow this law after losing two fingers while in Iroquois captivity, resulting in the requirement for dispensation by the pope. Jogues visited his mother in Orléans, but was eager to return to the missions. Jogues experienced regret over his time in captivity, and a longing for martyrdom that motivated his return to New France in 1644 after only a year and a half in France, first to Quebec, followed by a trip to Wendake.

Return to New France and death 
In the spring of 1646, Jogues returned to Iroquois territory, along with Jean de Lalande, to act as the French ambassador to the Mohawk. His ambassadorship was intended to maintain the tentative peace reached in 1645 between the Iroquois and the French, the Huron and the Algonquin. This was done to ensure a safe passage for trade and travel.

Jogues and Lalande were met with hesitation upon arrival, as some Mohawk regarded missionaries as evil practitioners of foreign magic. The Europeans transmitted European diseases, such as smallpox and measles, that spread among Native Americans. These diseases resulted in high fatality rates among the Mohawk, who lacked immunity to the new diseases. When the Mohawk suffered yet another outbreak of infectious disease and crop failure at Ossernenon, they blamed these unfortunate events on Catholic paraphernalia left behind by the Jesuits, which the Mohawks perceived as magically harmful. Additionally, as a result of his previous experience on the territory, Jogues demonstrated an uncanny knowledge of the territory, which the Mohawks perceived as threatening.

On 18 October 1646, the Mohawks killed Jogues with a tomahawk; they killed LaLande the next day. They threw the missionaries' bodies into the Mohawk River. The killing seems to have been the work of an anti-French faction within the Mohawk community.

The story holds a curious double martyrdom of Jogues. Aboriginal allies of the French captured Jogues' killer in 1647 and condemned him to death. While awaiting his execution, this man was baptized and renamed with the Christian name of Father Isaac Jogues. His death represented a secondary martyring of Isaac Jogues.

Attitudes towards martyrdom 
Jogues' refusal to escape and how he embraced torture demonstrate selflessness that, like many other Jesuits in New France, he believed that being martyred would mean partaking in the torment that Jesus had endured on the cross. This would indicate his acceptance "into the pantheon of heroes whose physical and spiritual strength had been equal to the cruel persecutions inflicted on the primitive church." Jogues is quoted as saying: "He [Jesus] was making us share his sufferings, and admitting us to participate in his crosses."

At another point, Jogues speaks of, "The procession [of torture victims] beginning to enter this narrow way of Paradise . . . it was indeed then that I could say with my Lord and master, Supra dorsum meum fabricaverunt peccatores,—'Sinners have built and left monuments and marks of their rage upon my back.'" Jogues regarded his torture, and the death he thought would follow, as allowing him to imitate, and thus participate in, the passion of Jesus.

Veneration and legacy 
Jogues was canonized on 29 June 1930 by Pope Pius XI along with seven other Canadian Martyrs. His feast day is celebrated on 19 October in the General Roman Calendar, and on 26 September in Canada. Jogues and companions are patron saints of North America.

There are several buildings and monuments dedicated to Jogues. The largest of these monuments is the Shrine of the North American Martyrs, built in Auriesville, New York in 1930. It honors Jogues, René Goupil, Louis Lalande, and Kateri Tekakwitha.  It was completed in 1930. The shrine also honors Jean de Brébeuf and five of his companions killed in Canada in 1648 and 1649.

There is also the Martyr's Shrine located in Midland, Ontario, Canada, which honors the Canadian Martyrs (another term for North American Martyrs).

A seasonal chapel on the east shore of Saratoga Lake, New York is named after Jogues. A statue of Jogues stands in front of the main entrance to the chapel that faces the lake. While he was being taken into captivity, Jogues is said to have been the first European to see this lake.

Fordham University, a Jesuit university in New York, has a dormitory building at its Rose Hill Campus named Martyrs' Court.  The three wings of the building are named after Jogues, René Goupil, and Jean de Lalande.

Another statue of Jogues was erected in 1939, in the village of Lake George, in the Battlefield Park by the lake.

Camp Ondessonk, a Roman Catholic youth camp located in Ozark, Illinois, is named after Jogues' Mohawk name.  The living quarters for campers are each named for one of the North American Martyrs, including Kateri Tekakwitha, Jean de Brébeuf, Noël Chabanel, Antoine Daniel, Charles Garnier, René Goupil, Jean de Lalande, and Gabriel Lalemant.

References

Further reading
 Campbell SJ, Thomas. Isaac Jogues: the Discoverer of Lake George
 Pope Pius XII to the Faithful of the United States and Canada for the Third Centenary of the North American Martyrs (24 November 1946).
 Mangled hands: a story of the New York Martyrs

Sources 

Francis Parkman, The Jesuits in North America in the Seventeenth Century, vol. 2 of France and England in North America (1867).

External links 

"Isaac Jogues." Dictionary of Canadian Biography. 
Our Lady of Martyrs Shrine. Our Lady of Martyrs Shrine. Auriesville, New York
Foley OFM, Leonard. "St. Isaac Jogues, Jean de Brébeuf, and Companions," Saint of the Day, Franciscan Media

1607 births
1646 deaths
Clergy from Orléans
17th-century French Jesuits
French Roman Catholic missionaries
Jesuit martyrs
Martyred Roman Catholic priests
17th-century Roman Catholic martyrs
Canonizations by Pope Pius XI
17th-century Christian saints
American Roman Catholic saints
Canadian Roman Catholic saints
French Roman Catholic saints
Jesuit saints
Jesuit missionaries in New France
People murdered in New York (state)
Male murder victims